The Stewart SF02 was the car with which the Stewart Formula One team used to compete in the 1998 Formula One season.  It was driven by Rubens Barrichello and Jan Magnussen at the start of 1998, with both in their second seasons with the team.  Magnussen was dropped after the 1998 Canadian Grand Prix, despite scoring his first-ever point at the event, and replaced for the remainder of the season by Jos Verstappen.

This was largely due to the pressures on a new team; having to race in a full F1 season for the first time, whilst preparing for next year. The car was late in production and therefore did not test enough to become a true front-running contender. Problems with reliability still remained as well, although these were not quite as bad as in 1997.

The team eventually finished eighth in the Constructors' Championship, with five points.

Complete Formula One results
(key) (results in bold indicate pole position)

References

AUTOCOURSE 1998-99, Henry, Alan (ed.), Hazleton Publishing Ltd. (1998)

External links

Stewart Formula One cars
1998 Formula One season cars
Texaco